This is a list of spacecraft deployed from the International Space Station. The International Space Station deploys spacecraft using the Japanese Small Satellite Orbital Deployer on the Japanese Experiment Module, the NanoRacks CubeSat Deployer and SSIKLOPS and the Nauka MLM experiments airlock module.

List

2005 to 2011

2012

2013

2014

2015

2016

2017

2018

2019

2020

2021

2022

Spacecraft awaiting deployment 
The following spacecrafts have been brought to the ISS and are scheduled to be deployed.

See also 

Lists of spacecraft

References 

 
ISS